Loudoun School for Advanced Studies (LSAS) is a private school in Ashburn, Virginia, United States and is designed to inspire and challenge advanced students in grades 6-12.

Students from LSAS worked to rehabilitate the historic Ashburn Colored School, which is located on the same property where LSAS has built its new campus.

Covid-19 Plan 
LSAS follows CDC guidelines and has a policy informed by the Virginia Council of Private Education and the Governor’s Phase Guidance for Virginia Schools. Steps taken to combat the risk of Covid-19 infection include:

 Installation of hospital grade UV-C air disinfection system
 Video conferencing capability in all classrooms and meeting spaces
 Daily health screening
 Face covering requirement for all teachers and students
 Small classes and large open meeting areas
 Improved sanitizing practices

References

Private high schools in Virginia
Private middle schools in Virginia
Schools in Loudoun County, Virginia
Educational institutions established in 2008
2008 establishments in Virginia